In 1324, while staying in Cairo during his hajj, Mansa Musa, the ruler of the Mali Empire, told an Egyptian official whom he had befriended that he had come to rule when his predecessor led a large fleet in an attempt to cross the Atlantic Ocean and never returned. This account, recorded by the Arab historian al-Umari, has attracted considerable interest and speculation as a possible instance of pre-Columbian trans-oceanic contact. The voyage is popularly attributed to a Mansa Abu Bakr II, but no such mansa ever reigned. Rather, the voyage is inferred to have been undertaken by Mansa Muhammad ibn Qu.

A precise date for the suggested voyage is not known, though it is interpreted as having occurred in or shortly before 1312, the year Musa is inferred to have become mansa. No clear evidence of the fate of the voyage has been found.

Musa's account

Mansa Musa stayed in Cairo for three months in 1324 while en route to Mecca for the hajj. While there, he befriended an emir named Abu al-Hasan Ali ibn Amir Hajib, who was the governor of the district of Cairo Musa was staying in. Ibn Amir Hajib later recounted to the scholar al-Umari what he had learned of Mali from his conversations with Musa. In one such conversation, Ibn Amir Hajib had asked Musa how he had become king, and Musa responded:

Al-Umari’s record of this conversation is the only account of this voyage, as it is not mentioned by other medieval Arab historians or West African oral tradition. Nonetheless, the possibility of such a voyage has been taken seriously by several historians.

Identity of Musa's predecessor

The identity of the mansa responsible for the voyage has been subject to some confusion. Al-Umari’s record of Musa’s account does not mention mansa’s name, giving no indication of his identity other than that he was Musa’s predecessor. According to the Arab historian Ibn Khaldun, writing several decades later, Musa’s predecessor as mansa was Muhammad ibn Qu. As such, several historians have attributed the voyage to Mansa Muhammad.

Many sources call the mansa in question Abu Bakr II. However, the inclusion of a Mansa Abu Bakr II in the list of Malian rulers is an error that originated in a mistranslation of Ibn Khaldun’s text by the 19th-century European historian Baron de Slane. De Slane translated Ibn Khaldun as saying that the kingship passed from Muhammad to Abu Bakr, then to Musa. However, in the original Arabic text, Abu Bakr is only mentioned in his role as the progenitor of Musa's lineage, not as a ruler. The Abu Bakr in question was a brother of Sunjata, the founder of the Mali Empire, and apparently never himself ruled. Another figure named Abu Bakr did rule as mansa, but he was the predecessor of Sakura, not Musa.

Additionally, some historians have suggested without elaboration that the voyage should be attributed to Mansa Qu, who was the father and predecessor of Muhammad ibn Qu according to Ibn Khaldun.

Interpretation

No uncontroversial evidence of pre-Columbian contact between Africa and the Americas has ever been found. Regardless of whether any of the Malian ships ever reached the Americas, they apparently never returned to Africa and there were not any long-term economic consequences of the voyage.

The river on the sea described by the survivor of the first expedition is presumably the Canary Current. The inclusion of this fact in Musa's account indicates that Musa had some awareness of the oceanographic conditions of the open Atlantic. The Canary Current flows from West Africa to the Americas, which would have facilitated travel from Africa to the Americas but prevented it in the opposite direction.

Ivan van Sertima and Malian researcher Gaoussou Diawara proposed that the voyage reached the New World. Van Sertima cites the abstract of Columbus's log made by Bartolomé de las Casas, according to which the purpose of Columbus's third voyage was to test both the claims of King John II of Portugal that "canoes had been found which set out from the coast of Guinea [West Africa] and sailed to the west with merchandise" as well as the claims of the native inhabitants of the Caribbean island of Hispaniola that "from the south and the southeast had come black people whose spears were made of a metal called guanín ... from which it was found that of 32 parts: 18 were gold, 6 were silver, and 8 copper."

However, scholars dispute evidence of any such voyage reaching the Americas, and that there are insufficient evidentiary grounds to suppose there has been contact between Africa and the New World at any point in the pre-Columbian era., Haslip-Viera et al. noted in particular that "no genuine African artifact has ever been found in a controlled archaeological excavation in the New World". Karl Taube, a professor at UC Riverside specializing in pre-Columbian Mesoamerican history writes there "simply is no material evidence of any Pre-Hispanic contact between the Old World and Mesoamerica before the arrival of the Spanish in the sixteenth century".

Legacy

Mansa Musa himself appears to have considered his predecessor's plan to be impractical. The main point he appears to have been trying to make to Ibn Amir Hajib is that his predecessor's failed voyage paved the way to his becoming king. Likewise, it has been speculated that the lack of information in oral tradition about the voyage reflects a view that the mansa's voyage was a shameful abdication of duty.

In modern times, the voyage has become more celebrated. The Malian historian Gaoussou Diawara has remarked that the mansa should be looked up to by modern politicians as an example of a ruler who valued science and discovery over holding onto power.

Footnotes

References

Bibliography

See also
 Zheng He (admiral of the 14th-century Chinese long-distance fleet)

External links
 Malian praise singer Sadio Diabate, singing about Abubakar II - BBC World Service Audio

1312
Mali Empire
Pre-Columbian trans-oceanic contact
Hyperdiffusionism
Transatlantic relations
14th century in Africa